The Chilean–Peruvian territorial dispute is a territorial dispute between Chile and Peru that started in the aftermath of the War of the Pacific and ended significantly in 1929 with the signing of the Treaty of Lima and in 2014 with a ruling by the International Court of Justice. The dispute applies since 2014 to a 37,610 km2 territory in the Chile–Peru border, as a result of the maritime dispute between both states.

Background
Unlike other South American border conflicts, after the Chilean and Peruvian wars of independence, both countries did not share a border until 1883 due to Bolivia's Litoral Department. With the War of the Pacific beginning in 1879, the Chilean land and naval campaigns saw quick success, with the war ending with Peru signing the Treaty of Ancón in 1883, and Bolivia signing the Treaty of Valparaiso the following year. As a result of the former treaty, Peru ceded its Tarapacá Department and established a new border with Chile, while the Chilean government administered the territories of Tacna and Arica under the newly established Tacna Province until a plebiscite could be held in 1894. From 1890 to 1929, Locumba served as the provisional capital of the area of the Department of Tacna not under Chilean administration, which came to be known as Free Tacna.

Tacna and Arica dispute

In the aftermath of the signing of the Treaty of Ancón, the Department of Tarapacá was unconditionally ceded to Chile, being replaced by Tarapacá Province, and the provinces of Tacna and Arica were placed under the administration of the new Tacna Province. As per the treaty, a plebiscite was to be held in 1894, which would determine the fate of the province. The plebiscite, however, was never carried out. During this time, the term Captive provinces was used to refer to Tacna and Arica.

During the early years of the post-war era, the Chilean and Peruvian governments exercised extensive campaigns in order to solidify their control over the region. On one hand, Peru established a campaign of foreign support, which attracted the attention of the United States as a mediator in the conflict. On the other hand, Chile established a campaign of acculturation known as Chilenization, which saw the establishment of Chilean culture and a Chilean population in the region. One legacy of Chilean presence in Tacna was the Tacna Prefecture, the building where the intendant resided. Local Peruvian loyalists also established resistance movements, which saw armed combat on at least one occasion. To counter this and to incite an exodus of Peruvians that remained in the area, groups known as Patriotic Leagues were established.

Tarata Department

In 1885, the Department of Tarata was established by Chile as a subdivision of Tacna Province. The creation of the Department caused controversy in Peru, due to both countries disagreeing on their border in the Sama river. While the Chilean government argued the town was to the east of the river, the border agreed upon by both countries, Peru disputed this claim on the grounds that the territory was not affected by the Treaty of Ancón and established a policy of non-recognition. Around this time, there were claims of military escalation, including claims of Peruvian troops mobilizing near the Chilean border, which were denied by the Peruvian government.

The Department was abolished under Arturo Alessandri's administration by law № 3,802 on September 22, 1921. On September 1st, 1925, at exactly 10 a.m., Chile handed over the former Department to Peru in a ceremony that took place in the main square, with representatives from both countries present: with  representing Chile, Manuel de Freyre y Santander representing Peru, and General Pershing representing the United States.

Treaty of Lima

On June 3, 1929, the Treaty of Lima was signed by then Peruvian Representative Pedro José Rada y Gamio and Chilean Representative Emiliano Figueroa Larraín, leading to the effective return of Tacna to Peru at midnight, on the 28th of August 1929, creating the Department of Tacna, and Arica (both the former Peruvian Department as well as some territory of the Department of Tacna ceded by the treaty) was permanently given to Chile, being integrated into the Tarapacá Province, ending the existence of the Chilean Province of Tacna. Nevertheless, even with the border conflict officially over, controversy would continue among nationals of both Peru and Bolivia, who would continue her claims over her lost territories, seeking once again a connection to the ocean with the assistance of international mediators on the issue which is yet to be solved, and continues to this day. The handover had no official ceremony, with some Chilean officials temporarily staying behind to assist Peru regarding the new administration. Nonetheless, the return of the territory was met with celebrations in Peru, with President Augusto B. Leguía overseeing a military parade in Lima, and church bells ringing in celebration. Some Chilean citizens, who had remained in the province after the handover asked to be repatriated.

Charaña Accords

In 1975, the Chilean government of Augusto Pinochet made a proposal to Bolivia consisting in a swap of a narrow continuous corridor of Chilean land from the sea to the border between Chile and Bolivia, running parallel to the border between Chile and Peru, making the Lluta River Chile's northern border, in exchange for the same amount of Bolivian territory. The proposal, known as the Charaña Accords, involved former Peruvian land and according to the Treaty of Ancón, Chile could not give former Peruvian territories to other nations without Peru's agreement. Then dictator of Peru Francisco Morales-Bermúdez was opposed to these changes but proposed to make Arica a territory governed by the three states. Chile responded that it could not accept this complicated shared sovereignty.

Since Pinochet was likely aware that the Charaña proposals would fail in the end due to Peruvian opposition, legal and political analysts have suggested that he raised them just as a gesture towards Bolivia. Around the same time, from 1968 to 1980, President Juan Velasco Alvarado once again referred to Arica and Tarapacá with the term captive provinces.

Maritime dispute

Peru contended that its maritime boundary delimitation with Chile was not fixed, but Chile claimed that it holds no outstanding border issues with Peru. On January 16, 2008, Peru brought forth the case to the International Court of Justice at The Hague, the Netherlands, which accepted the case and formally filed it as the Case concerning maritime delimitation between the Republic of Peru and the Republic of Chile - Perú v. Chile.

The issue was first addressed in the 1980s by the then Foreign Minister of Peru, Allan Wagner, with the Minister of Foreign Affairs of Chile at the time, Jaime del Valle. The following year, the Peruvian Ambassador  had an interview with Foreign Minister Jaime del Valle on this matter, and handled a diplomatic note, dated May 23, 1986, known as the Bákula Memorandum. The document proposed the negotiation of maritime boundaries, supporting the Peruvian position that Chile and Peru had never signed a treaty that would delimit the maritime boundary between the two countries.

On January 27, 2014, the court ruled in favor of Peru. Under the ruling, Chile lost control over part of its formerly claimed maritime territory and ceded additional maritime territory to Peru. The ruling was met with criticism in Chile, with several figures criticizing the government's handling of the case.

Punto Concordia dispute

A dispute regarding a milestone known as Milestone 1 or Concordia Point and the area it establishes, known as the land triangle, was revived as a result of the ICJ ruling, due to the disagreement on where the new maritime border was to begin. The dispute consists of a bilateral disagreement on the exact location of the milestone, as both Chile and Peru have different locations for the exact placement. Both countries also claim to patrol the area, the former with the Quebrada de Escritos observation point and the latter with the Francisco Bolognesi outpost.

The milestones were first established by a border commission in 1930, 180 meters away from the coast. In the 1950s, maritime-related treaties and documents were signed by both countries: Ecuador, Chile and Peru in 1952 and 1954, and Peru in 1955. Several inconsistencies regarding the exact placement of the border and is continuity with the maritime border led to a notification sent from Peru to United Nations Secretary-General Kofi Annan in 2000. In 2001, several incidents occurred: a Chilean outpost was established in the disputed area, which led to controversy and protests by and was eventually removed by Chile "exclusively for the purpose of keeping the peace in the border area." On another occasion, a lighthouse in the area was destroyed by the 2001 southern Peru earthquake, with debris falling into the disputed area. After Peruvian authorities cleared the debris, the Chilean government alluded that Peru had entered Chilean territory without proper authorization.

A law was passed in Peru in 2005 which led to more controversy, and the dispute reached the United Nations a second time in 2007. During this time, both countries established subdivisions that made reference to the disputed area.

With the 2014 ruling, the ICJ clarified that it was not authorized to establish the exact location of Punto Concordia, and noted that the border established by the court had a possibility to not match said location, but that such a situation was to be coordinated by both parties to the dispute. Both parties subsequently argued this section of the ruling in their favor, with the maritime part of dispute solved, but the terrestrial part continuing.

Peru established the La Yarada-Los Palos District in 2015, with its borders once again alluding to the disputed area. Chile protested against the law, and declared it null and void in the context of the border between both states.

See also
Bolivian–Peruvian territorial dispute
Bolivian–Chilean territorial dispute
Colombian–Peruvian territorial dispute
Ecuadorian–Peruvian territorial dispute

References

History of Peru
History of the foreign relations of Chile
Territorial disputes of Chile
Territorial disputes of Peru
Chile–Peru border
Chile–Peru relations
Irredentism